Pioneer Island is an island of the Arctic Archipelago, in the territory of Nunavut. It lies at the northern end of Penny Strait, between Devon Island (to the south-east) and Crescent Island (to the north-west).

See also 
 List of arctic islands

References

External links 

Uninhabited islands of Qikiqtaaluk Region
Islands of the Queen Elizabeth Islands